Shiraz Ahmed is an Emirati cricketer. In December 2021, he was named as one of the overseas players for the Kandy Warriors in the draft for the 2021 Lanka Premier League, and made his Twenty20 debut on 8 December 2021.

References

External links
 

Year of birth missing (living people)
Living people
Emirati cricketers
Place of birth missing (living people)
Kandy Falcons cricketers